Fox Island(s) may refer to:

Canada
 Fox Island, Hermitage Bay, Newfoundland and Labrador, a settlement
 Fox Island, South Coast, Newfoundland and Labrador, a settlement
 Fox Island, Lake Kipawa, Quebec, uninhabited, located on the north end of Lake Kipawa near Kipawa, Quebec 
 Fox Island, Gulf of Saint Lawrence, Quebec, uninhabited, located South of Harrington Harbour, Quebec in the Gulf of Saint Lawrence
 Fox Islands (British Columbia), in that province's Central Coast region
 Fox Island Main, Nova Scotia
 Fox Island, New Brunswick
 Fox Island, Ontario is a small island in Lake Simcoe forms the reserve of the Chippewas of Georgina Island First Nation

Falkland Islands
 Fox Island, Falkland Islands

United States
Fox Islands (Alaska) in the Aleutians
Fox Island (Alaska) near Seward in Resurrection Bay
The islands of North Haven and Vinalhaven in Penobscot Bay, Maine
Fox Island (Massachusetts) in the Charles River
Fox Islands (Michigan) in northern Lake Michigan
Fox Island (Detroit River), another island in southeastern Michigan
Fox Island (Thousand Islands) in Lake Ontario (Thousand Islands) 
Fox Island (Rhode Island) in Narragansett Bay
Fox Island, Washington